Toontown Online, commonly known as Toontown, was a 2003 massively multiplayer online role-playing game based on a cartoon animal world, developed by Disney's Virtual Reality Studio and Schell Games, and published by The Walt Disney Company.  

Players created characters known as Toons and used weapons referred to as Gags—commonly slapstick comedy items, such as a thrown cream pie—to fight and destroy Cogs, robot businessmen who served as the game’s antagonists.

Various servers hosting Toontown Online were shut down throughout the game’s tenure, with the US servers and the game itself closing in September 2013. Since the game’s closure, various fan servers have been created using most of the game’s original assets. The most popular of these, Toontown Rewritten, was created some days after Toontown Online’s closure.

Gameplay

Toons 
Players could create characters called "Toons". Players were able to customize their Toons in various shapes, colors, clothes, and sizes, as well as their species, with choices consisting of cats, dogs, ducks, mice, pigs, rabbits, bears, horses, and monkeys.

Combat 
"Cogs" were the antagonists in-game, stylized to be corporate robots that wanted to take over the town to propagate business culture. Cogs came in four types: brown-clad Bossbots, blue-clad Lawbots, green-clad Cashbots, and maroon-clad Sellbots, each with increasing levels throughout the game that increased their health and damage.

Toons began with basic 'Gags' and a 15-point 'Laff' meter and had a maximum of 137 point Laff meter at the end of the game. Gags, rooted in old cartoon slapstick humor, were weapons used to destroy the Cogs in Cog battles. Each 'Gag track' had Gags with different properties that could be unlocked by completing 'ToonTasks' and each gag track would get progressively more powerful as Toons used their gags more. The Laff meter functioned as a health meter, representing how much damage Toons could take from the Cogs before going 'sad' – in-game defeat. Cogs were battled using a timed turn-based combat system with up to four Toons in a battle. Cogs could be fought on the streets of the game, in 'Cog Buildings' or in their own designated 'Cog HQ', with each Cog HQ having a boss that could only be fought by obtaining a full set of the HQ's Cog disguise. These include the Senior V.P. (Vice President, Sellbot HQ), C.F.O. (Chief Financial Officer, Cashbot HQ) C.J. (Chief Justice, Lawbot HQ), and C.E.O. (Chief Executive Officer, Bossbot HQ).

Non-combat activities 
Playgrounds were the only areas of Toontown permanently safe from Cogs. In the playgrounds, Toons could regain lost Laff Points, receive or complete ToonTasks unique to each playground, purchase gags, play trolley games, go fishing, kart racing, or golfing. By completing ToonTasks, Toons would grow in strength through additional Laff Points or new Gags. Laff Point increases were also available through fishing, racing, and golfing challenges. There was a playground in each neighborhood of Toontown. Each playground featured one of Disney's classic animated characters as a non-player character. The main playgrounds were Toontown Central, Daisy Gardens, Donald's Dock, Minnie's Melodyland, The Brrrgh, and Donald's Dreamland, along with extra playgrounds such as Goofy Speedway and Chip 'n Dale's Acorn Acres.

Every Toontown Online account came with a player's estate. Each estate consisted of a fishing pond and six houses for each Toon on the player's account. Players could customize their Toon's appearance and home with objects ordered from the in-game catalog ('Clarabelle's Cattlelog') by using jellybeans, the in-game currency. Wardrobes and accessory trunks held clothing and accessories that were not currently being worn by the player's Toon. Other elements of estates included Doodles (pets), gardening, fishing, and the ability to purchase various types of in-game items from Clarabelle's Cattlelog.

Online safety features 
Toontown Online was marketed and developed for players of all ages, which is why a chat restriction was placed on the game. Players could only chat using "SpeedChat", a list of pre-approved phrases set by Disney that the player could select. It included general English phrases, in-game strategy phrases, and, occasionally, seasonal phrases. Players could purchase more SpeedChat phrases using, most of the time, 100 jellybeans. "SpeedChat Plus" and "Secret Friends", later renamed to "True Friends", were introduced sometime after the game's release, which had to be enabled using a parental account if the player was under 13 years of age. SpeedChat Plus allowed the player to type their messages against a word filter developed by Disney; if a word was not allowed, it was replaced with an onomatopoeia of that player's Toon's species. True Friends allowed players to chat with a less restrictive filter with certain friends who have shared a "True Friend code" with each other.

Parties 
Parties were hostable, plannable, and customizable events by Toons. Toons would use their stored jellybeans in their bank to customize and add content to their parties, such as fireworks, minigames (Tug-O-War, etc.), trampolines, party cannons, etc. To plan a party, Toons would go to a Toon Party Planner. Toons could also customize their invitations to these parties.

Distribution

CD-ROM 
Platform Publishing, a subsidiary company of Sony Online Entertainment that publishes games for third-party developers, acquired rights to publish a CD version of Toontown Online in August 2005 for the PC and their intention to bring the game to online game consoles. Toontown Online became available on CD for the PC on October 3, 2005. This allowed players to play the game without downloading it onto their storage devices. This version came in a box set with two months of subscription, a poster, a game manual, and an in-game bonus. Toontown Online chose to create a CD that could be purchased in stores, due to customer insecurity when downloading and buying things online that they could not physically hold.

Closure 
After ten years of operation, Toontown Online was shut down permanently on September 19, 2013. Subsequently, every player was given membership for the remaining time of the game. Seasonal and holiday celebrations and special in-game events took place in the time remaining. Recurring paid memberships were automatically canceled. Memberships could no longer be purchased, and accounts could no longer be created after the fact. The website was also updated with a closing FAQ.

After the game's closure, Toontowns website was updated with a new FAQ to help with billing support and inform users about the game's closure. Toontown site, toontown.go.com, now redirects to Disney's main site, disney.com.

In response to the closure, former players have created multiple private servers of Toontown Online that are free-to-play and not monetized. The most popular server, Toontown Rewritten, is described by its developers as "a fan-made revival of Disney's Toontown Online, created using publicly available downloads and information made freely available to the general public in September 2014.

Jesse Schell, the former Creative Director of the Walt Disney Imagineering Virtual Reality Studio, hinted that Toontown Online closed due to becoming unsustainable in its business model (subscription-based downloadable RPG). Schell confirmed that Disney wanted to port the game to mobile devices but was waiting for a working business model for self-sustaining, constantly-updating mobile RPGs. Schell also stated that the company has hosted internal meetings discussing the future of the game, taking the popularity of mobile games, and the payment options available on that platform into consideration for planning the next step for the Toontown license. A solution has yet to be agreed upon, but according to Schell, these internal meetings continued into 2016.

Seven years after the game's closure on June 2, 2021, an unofficial archive of Toontown Online titled the "Toontown Preservation Project" was released by Toontown Rewritten. The archive is hosted via Toontown Rewritten's Notion board and features original design documents and artwork donated by the game's developers, among promotional material such as digital downloads, merchandise, newsletters, trading cards, and websites.

ToonFest 
Disney organized two real-life gatherings for Toontown fans called ToonFest. It included themed activities and games, trivia and costume contests, previews of upcoming features for the game, and developer Q&A panels. The first gathering, ToonFest 2006, was held at the Walt Disney Studios complex in Burbank, California. The second gathering, ToonFest 2007, was held at Walt Disney World in Orlando, Florida.

Reception

Awards and nominations

References

External links 

 

2003 video games
Disney video games
Inactive massively multiplayer online games
Inactive multiplayer online games
MacOS games
Massively multiplayer online role-playing games
Multiplayer online games
Online games
Products and services discontinued in 2013
Video games about animals
Video games developed in the United States
Windows games